The Navajo Nation Presidential Election of 2015 was the most controversial yet. The primary election was held on August 26, 2014 with Joe Shirley Jr. coming in first with 10,910 votes, and Chris Deschene in second place with 9,734 votes.

Originally the general election was to be held between Joe Shirley Jr., former President of the Navajo Nation and Chris Deschene on Tuesday November 4, 2014. However, two former presidential candidates, Dale E. Tsosie & Hank Whitethorne, who were eliminated in the Primary election challenged Deschene's candidacy over his fluency of the Navajo Language, a requirement to run for president. Eventually disqualifying Chris Deschene and running mate Fannie L. Atcitty.

The special election was held on April 21, 2015 between Joe Shirley Jr.. & Dineh Benally vs. the third place contender in the primary election, Russell Begaye & Jonathan Nez.

Candidates

Advanced to general election 

 Joe Shirley Jr. former Navajo Nation President (2003-2011), vying for a third term.
 Dineh Benally.
 Chris Deschene, Marine Veteran & former AZ State House of Representatives.**
 Fannie L. Atcitty, Navajo lifelong educator and community organizer.**

 Russell Begaye, incumbent Council Delegate of the Shiprock Chapter, advanced through disqualification of Deschene-Atcitty campaign.
 Jonathan Nez, incumbent Council Delegate of the Ts'ah Bii Kin, Navajo Mountain, Shonto, & Oljato Chapters.

**Disqualified on October 9, 2014.

Eliminated in primary 
 Russell Begaye, incumbent Council Delegate of the Navajo Nation (Shiprock).
 Donald Benally
 Kenneth Maryboy
 Edison Wauneka
 Ben Shelly, incumbent President of the Navajo Nation.
 Myron McLaughlin
 Carrie Lynn Martin
 Dale E. Tsosie
 Duane H. Yazzie
 Moroni Benally
 Cal Nez
 Edison "Chip" Begay
 Hank Whitethorne
 Kee Yazzie Mann
 Dan Smith

Results 
Registered voters was a total of 130,000 and just about 37% of registered voters participated in the 2015 special presidential election.

References 

Navajo Nation elections
Navajo